Thomas or Tommy Cronin may refer to:
 Thomas Cronin (born 1940), American scientist
 Tommy Cronin (1896–1964), American football player
 Tommy Cronin (footballer) (born 1932), English footballer